Semyonovka is a rural locality in Vyshnederevensky Selsoviet Rural Settlement, Lgovsky District, Kursk Oblast, Russia. Population:

Geography 
The village is located on the Malaya Loknya River (a left tributary of the Loknya in the Psel basin), 25 km from the Russia–Ukraine border, 73 km south-west of Kursk, 24.5 km south of the district center – the town Lgov, 14.5 km from the selsoviet center – Vyshniye Derevenki.

 Climate
Semyonovka has a warm-summer humid continental climate (Dfb in the Köppen climate classification).

Transport 
Semyonovka is located 21 km from the road of regional importance  (Kursk – Lgov – Rylsk – border with Ukraine), 2 km from the road  (Lgov – Sudzha), 16 km from the road  (Rylsk – Korenevo – Sudzha), 3.5 km from the road of intermunicipal significance  (38K-030 – Kauchuk – 38K-024), 2.5 km from the nearest (closed) railway halt Anastasyevka (railway line Lgov I — Podkosylev).

The rural locality is situated 80 km from Kursk Vostochny Airport, 128 km from Belgorod International Airport and 279 km from Voronezh Peter the Great Airport.

References

Notes

Sources

Rural localities in Lgovsky District
Lgovsky Uyezd